Mira Sethi (born January 12, 1987) is a Pakistani actress and writer. The daughter of journalists Najam Sethi and Jugnu Mohsin, she attended Lahore Grammar School and Cheltenham Ladies' College then graduated from Wellesley College in 2010; she spent her junior year abroad at the University of Oxford. At Wellesley, she studied English and South Asian studies, and, at her 2010 graduation, was the student commencement speaker. Sethi was a Robert L. Bartley fellow and an assistant book editor at The Wall Street Journal  and also contributed in political commentary for the newspaper, particularly on the subject of Pakistan. Her career at the Journal lasted about two and a half years.

In 2011, Sethi returned to Pakistan to pursue an acting career. Her first role was playing Natasha in the ARY Digital serial drama Silvatein. She followed it with Mohabat Subh Ka Sitara Hai, which aired on Hum TV. Sethi continues to write both fiction and journalism. Her collection of short stories was expected to be published by Knopf and Bloomsbury in 2018.

Personal life 
In 2019, Sethi married with her long-time boyfriend, Bilal Siddiqui, in an intimate ceremony in California, USA.

Television

Filmography
 2018 7 Din Mohabbat In as Princess Sonu

References

External links 

 

Living people
1986 births
Lahore Grammar School alumni
People educated at Cheltenham Ladies' College
Wellesley College alumni
Mira
The Wall Street Journal people
Pakistani women journalists
21st-century Pakistani actresses
Actresses from Lahore
Journalists from Lahore
Punjabi people
Women writers from Punjab, Pakistan